Ficus mexiae is a species of fig in the family Moraceae, native to Brazil.

The tree is endemic to the Atlantic Forest ecoregion of Southeast Brazil, within the states of Bahia and Minas Gerais.

It is an IUCN Red List Vulnerable species.

See also

References

Sources
 Current IUCN Red List of All Threatened Species

mexiae
Endemic flora of Brazil
Flora of the Atlantic Forest
Flora of Bahia
Flora of Minas Gerais
Trees of Brazil
Vulnerable flora of South America
Taxonomy articles created by Polbot